William Hiram Brawley (incorrectly reported in some works as William Huggins Brawley; May 13, 1841 – November 15, 1916) was a United States representative from South Carolina and later a United States district judge of the United States District Court for the District of South Carolina.

Education and career

Born on May 13, 1841, in Chester, Chester County, South Carolina, Brawley attended the common schools and graduated from South Carolina College (now the University of South Carolina) in 1860. He enlisted as a private in Company F, Sixth Regiment, South Carolina Infantry, Confederate States Army on April 11, 1861. He lost an arm in the Battle of Seven Pines and was retired from service. He was manager of his family's plantation from 1862 to 1864. He traveled and studied in Europe in 1864 and 1865. He was admitted to the bar and entered private practice in Chester from 1866 to 1868. He was solicitor for the Sixth Judicial Circuit of South Carolina from 1868 to 1874. He resumed private practice in Charleston, South Carolina from 1874 to 1893. He was a member of the South Carolina House of Representatives from 1882 to 1890.

Congressional service

Brawley was elected as a Democrat from South Carolina's 1st congressional district to the United States House of Representatives of the 52nd and 53rd United States Congresses and served from March 4, 1891, until February 12, 1894, when he resigned to accept a federal judicial post.

Federal judicial service

Brawley was nominated by President Grover Cleveland on December 20, 1893, to a seat on the United States District Court for the District of South Carolina vacated by Judge Charles Henry Simonton. He was confirmed by the United States Senate on January 18, 1894, and received his commission the same day. His service terminated on June 14, 1911, due to his retirement.

Death

Following his retirement from the federal bench, Brawley lived in retirement in Charleston. He died on November 15, 1916, in Charleston. He was interred in Magnolia Cemetery in Charleston.

Family

Brawley was the cousin of John J. Hemphill and great-uncle of Robert W. Hemphill.

References

Sources

External links

 Our Civil War in Retrospect, William H. Brawley, National Magazine, September, 1905 (with photo)
 

1841 births
1916 deaths
Judges of the United States District Court for the District of South Carolina
United States federal judges appointed by Grover Cleveland
19th-century American judges
American amputees
American politicians with disabilities
Confederate States Army soldiers
Democratic Party members of the United States House of Representatives from South Carolina
19th-century American politicians
United States federal judges admitted to the practice of law by reading law
People from Chester, South Carolina
People of South Carolina in the American Civil War
Burials at Magnolia Cemetery (Charleston, South Carolina)